Jerry Azumah (born September 1, 1977) is a former American football cornerback who played seven seasons for the Chicago Bears of the National Football League (NFL).  He played college football for the University of New Hampshire, and was selected by the Bears in the fifth round of the 1999 NFL Draft.

Early years 
Azumah is the first-generation American son of Theophilus and Bertha Azumah, natives of Ghana. Azumah was born in Oklahoma and grew up in Worcester, Massachusetts. At an early age, he played for the Worcester Vikings Pop Warner football team. Azumah attended Saint Peter-Marian High School receiving football honors as a Central Massachusetts and Shriners All-Star.

Collegiate years 
Azumah attended the University of New Hampshire where he was a four-year starter on offense for Chip Kelly as an All-American tailback. One of the most decorated running backs in NCAA history, Azumah rushed for a national career-record 6,193 yards. At that time the only player in Division 1-AA history to rush for over 1,000+ yards four times. Held Division 1-AA record with 8,276 career all-purpose yards. Eclipsed 100 yards rushing in 25 of 41 games played at New Hampshire. Rushed for more than 200 yards in a game nine times and 300 yards twice. Averaged almost six yards a carry over collegiate career. In 1999, Azumah was the first recipient of the Jim Urquhart Student-Athlete of the Year Award. This annual award is bestowed upon UNH senior student-athletes who excel both in athletic competition and the classroom, in addition to possessing sportsmanship, great character, and passion for sports.

SENIOR: Walter Payton Award recipient as the top offensive player in Division 1-AA football. Unanimous All-American, All-Atlantic Ten Conference selection, and ECAC All-Star. New England Player of the Year and Atlantic Ten Offensive Player of the Year. Shattered conference and school season records with 343 carries for 2,195 yards and 22 touchdowns. Second on the team with 20 catches for 218 yards. Averaged 247.8 all-purpose yards per game. Eclipsed 200 yards in five games as a senior. Rushed for 259 yards on 22 carries and scored school-record five touchdowns vs East Stroudsburg. Suffered a hip-pointer vs Delaware in the second quarter, but returned in the fourth and still gained 196 yards on 29 carries. Rushed 52 times for 235 yards and a touchdown vs Connecticut. Rushed for 235 yards and returned a kickoff 82 yards for a touchdown vs William & Mary. Scored four touchdowns and ran for 24l yards vs UMass. Broke own school record with a career-high 329-yard rushing performance with five touchdowns vs Hofstra.
JUNIOR: All-American First-team as a returner by the American Football Coaches Association and Second-team honors as a running back from the AP and The Sports Network. ECAC All-Star, Golden Helmet recipient, All-Atlantic Ten Conference, and All-New England First-team. Led conference and ranked sixth in the nation with 1,585 yards on 271 carries with 17 touchdowns. Caught 26 passes for 298 yards and three scores. Rushed for 189 yards and a touchdown on 28 carries vs Maine. Season-high 300-yard rushing performance on 26 carries vs Boston College.
SOPHOMORE: Named All-ECAC, All-New England, and All-Yankee First-team. Yankee Conference Offensive Player of the Year and ECAC Golden Helmet recipient. Led conference in rushing (1,308), scoring (126), and all-purpose yards (2,109). Rushed for 196 yards and two touchdowns on 27 carries vs UConn. Earned Football Gazette National Player of the Week honors after rushing for 248 yards with three touchdowns and caught seven passes for 70 yards vs Lehigh. Ran for 210 yards and added 82 yards receiving on six catches vs Umass.
FRESHMAN: Appeared in eight games with seven starts in the first season. Led team with 186 carries for 1,105 yards and eight touchdowns. Finished with 123 yards rushing in his first start vs Rhode Island. Exploded for 284 yards on 38 carries vs Lehigh.

In 2005, Azumah was inducted into the New Hampshire Wildcats Athletic Council Hall of Fame.

NFL career 

Azumah was selected by the Chicago Bears as the 147th pick of the 1999 NFL Draft out of the University of New Hampshire. In Azumah's first year with the Chicago Bears, he won the prestigious Brian Piccolo Award. This award is given to a Chicago Bear by his teammates. Brian Piccolo played four seasons as a running back for the Chicago Bears from 1965–1968. Piccolo died from cancer in 1970 when he was just 26 years old. The Chicago Bears created the Brian Piccolo award to honor a teammate's courage, loyalty, teamwork and dedication.

Azumah, who was a running back in college, continued to make the transition into an NFL defensive back. As his NFL experience grew, he also saw time on special teams and special situations on defense. In 2001 Azumah was given a contract extension. On January 19, 2002, during the divisional playoff game versus the Philadelphia Eagles, Azumah intercepted then quarterback Donovan McNabb and returned the ball 39 yards for a touchdown. That was the last touchdown scored in old Soldier Field.

His best season came in 2003 when he led the league in kickoff returns with a twenty-nine-yard average and two touchdowns. In 2004, Azumah was selected to represent the NFC in the NFL Pro Bowl as a kick returner. In that game Azumah broke the record for return yards with 228. He also recovered a fumble.

For Azumah's career, he appeared in 105 games with 48 starts. He had 384 tackles, 10 interceptions, 29 pass defense, 6.5 sacks, 6 forced fumbles and one recovery. Azumah retired in March 2006.

Notable UNH teammates of Jerry Azumah are Jason Ball (San Diego Chargers), Dan Kreider (Pittsburgh Steelers, St. Louis Rams, Arizona Cardinals) Randal Williams (Dallas Cowboys, Oakland Raiders) and Ryan Day (Ohio State Head Football Coach).

Post NFL career 
Azumah has been seen on the Chicago Bears post game coverage and commentary on WFLD-TV, Fox Chicago and appeared weekly on Fox Chicago's Good Day Chicago. Azumah started his television broadcasting career on Comcast SportsNet Chicago in 2006 as a post game analyst and feature reporter. Azumah also worked for ESPN 1000 radio in Chicago in 2010.

Philanthropic activity 
Azumah became a board member of the University of New Hampshire Foundation in 2001. The Foundation builds private support for the University of New Hampshire. In the summer of 2003, Azumah donated a six-figure gift to the Foundation which was directed to the University's athletic department. The Jerry Azumah Performance Center was a direct result of Azumah's gift. At age 25, Azumah became the youngest UNH alumnus to give a gift over $100,000.

In 2004 Azumah started the Azumah Student Assistance Program (ASAP). ASAP is a charitable 501(c)(3) organization and provides scholarships for disadvantaged students that attend private, secondary education. The program helps students in both Massachusetts and Illinois.

As a retired member of the Chicago Bears Football Club, Azumah joined the Board of Directors of Bears Care in 2006, the philanthropic arm of the Chicago Bears. Bears Care was founded in 1989 and supports youth athletics, education, medical research and treatment programs for breast and ovarian cancer. In 2022, Azumah joined the Metropolitan Family Services Board of Directors. MFS's mission is to provide and mobilize the services needed to strengthen families and communities.

Personal life 
Azumah has two children (Santiago and Valentino) with his fiancée Bianca. The Azumah family currently resides in Chicago, IL.

References

External links 
 

1977 births
Living people
American football cornerbacks
American football return specialists
American sports announcers
Chicago Bears players
New Hampshire Wildcats football players
National Conference Pro Bowl players
Walter Payton Award winners
Sportspeople from Oklahoma City
Players of American football from Oklahoma
American sportspeople of Ghanaian descent
Brian Piccolo Award winners